This is a list of Italian television related events from 1969.

Events 

 January 30 - February 1: Sanremo Festival, hosted by Nuccio Costa and Gabriella Farinon and won by Bobbby Solo and Iva Zanicchi with Zingara. This the only time that Lucio Battisti takes part in the contest, with Un’avventura. 
July 20-21. For the Apollo 11 mission, RAI airs a live show lasting 27 hours. It involved more than 200 technicians and journalists,  and included the presence of more than 500 guests (scientists, sportsmen and intellectuals, such as Michelangelo Antonioni and Alfonso Gatto). At 22:17 (Italian hour) the anchorman Tito Stagno announces the Moon landing with a minute in advance. He is corrected by the correspondent Ruggero Orlando, who follows the event from Houston Space center. The subsequent quarrel between the two journalists overshadows, for the Italian public, Neil Armstrong’s historical announcement: “The eagle is landed.” Despite this incident, the “night of the moon” is for RAI a professional achievement and a huge public success (20 million viewers).
December 12: an extraordinary edition of the TG1 announces to the country the Piazza Fontana bombing; the same evening, the Prime Minister Mariano Rumor, in a TV message to the nation, condemns indignantly the slaughter and promises justice. On December 15, RAI broadcasts live the burial of the victims. 
December 16: in the evening news, the young journalist Bruno Vespa, live from the Milan police headquarters, announces: “Pietro Valpreda is one of the guilty for the slaughter in Milan and for the attacks in Rome”. Valpreda was a dancer and leader of a small anarchist group, which was verbally extremist but fully unrelated to the crime. Valpreda is subsequently depicted by television and by most of the press as a monster. The TV show Stasera Gina Lollobrigida is deleted because he appears for a few seconds as an extra. Only Indro Montanelli, interviewed by Sergio Zavoli, declares that he does not believe that the anarchists were guilty.

Debuts

Serials 

 Nero Wolfe – by Giuliana Belrlinguer, with Tino Buazzelli in the title role and Paolo Ferrari as Archie Goodwin; 3 seasons. The series gets a huge public and critic success, with also 20 million viewers for episode; the same author Rex Stout declares to prefer it to the American versions of his character.

Variety 

 Speciale per voi (Special for you) – directed by Carla Ragionieri and Romolo Siena, with Renzo Arbore (at his TV debut); two seasons. The show is one of the first aimed explicitly to the young public and reflects, indirectly, the protests of 1968 ; in every episode, a guest singer faces an audience of teen-agers, often polemic and impertinent.

News and educational 

 AZ: un fatto come e perchè (AZ: a fact, how and why) – news magazine, hosted by Emilio Mastrostefano; 7 seasons.

Television shows

Drama 

 Eleonora Duse – by Flaminio Bollini, with Lilla Brignone in the title role and Giancarlo Sbragia as Gabriele D’Annunzio; in 2 episodes.

Miniseries 

 Atti degli Apostoli (Acts of the Apostles) – by Roberto Rossellini, international coproduction in five episodes.
Jekyll – from Robert Louis Stevenson’s Strange case of Doctor Jekyll and Mister Hyde - directed by Giorgio Albertazzi, with the same Albertazzi as the protagonist and Massimo Girotti as Utterson; in 4 episodes. The plot is faithful to the Stevenson’s one, also if the story is transferred in the swinging London.
I fratelli Karamazov (The Brothers Karamazov) – by Sandro Bolchi, from the Fyodor Dostoevskij’s novel, script by Diego Fabbri, with Corrado Pani, Umberto Orsini, Carla Gravina and Lea Massari; in 7 episodes. Two years after I promessi sposi, Bolchi gets another huge success both by public (15 million viewers) and by critics.
La donna di cuori (The queen of hearts) – by Leonardo Cortese, with Ubaldo Lay (as Lieutenant Sheridan), Emma Danieli, Sandra Mondaini (in her only dramatic role) and Amedeo Nazzari; 5 episodes. In this new chapter of the “Sheridan’s queens” series, the detective is, for the first time, in love and personally involved in the enquiry.
Giocando a golf una mattina (Playing golf in the morning) – mystery by Daniele D’Anza, from Francis Durbridge’s A game of murder, with Luigi Vannucchi and Aroldo Tieri; 6 episodes.

For children 

Le avventure di Ciuffettino (Little Turft’s adventures) – by Angelo D’Alessandro, from the Yambo’s novel, with Maurizio Ancidoni. A runaway boy lives, or dreams, fabulous asventures. 
Gulliver – by Carla Ragionieri, with Arturo Corso, music by Fabrizio De Andrè; 10 episodes. The Jonathan Swift’s novel is adapted in a musical comedy with a mixed cast of actors and puppets.

Variety 
 Aiuto, è vacanza! (Help, there are the holidays!) – summer show, directed by Eros Macchi, with Walter Chiari and Isabella Biagini.
Incontri musicali (Musical encounters) – hosted by Enza Sampò.
È domenica ma senza impegno – (It’s Sunday, but with no obligations) – by Vito Molinari; show of the Sunday afternoon, with Paolo Villaggio.
Incontro con Lucio Battisti (Meeting Lucio Battisti) - hosted by Battisti himself and Loretta Goggi.

News and educational 
Dicono di lei (They say about you) – interviews by Enzo Biagi.
Gli uomini della luna rispondono (The moon men answer) – press conference of the three Apollo 11 astronauts, hosted by Sergio Zavoli.
L’Italia dei dialetti (The dialects’ Italy) – linguistic enquiry by Giacomo Devoto, directed by Virgilio Sabel; in 14 episodes.

References 

1969 in Italian television